KL To Karaikudi  is a Malaysia Tamil language travelogue show that aired on Astro Vinmeen HD every Sunday . The show were presented and hosted by Malaysia actor Denes Kumar and Singapore tv anchor, Nisha Wong Directed by AV Ramesh. They hit the road on a travel adventure. Traversing through Malaysia, Thailand, Myanmar and India, they take on more than 7000 km on a Royal Enfield Desert Storm Classic Bike.

References

2010s Malaysian television series
Tamil-language television shows